Sir Edward Vaughan Williams (6 June 1797 – 2 November 1875) was a British judge.

Life
Born Blithfield, Staffordshire, he was the eldest surviving son of Welsh barrister John Williams. He was educated first at Winchester College from 1808, but moved to Westminster School in 1811. He entered Trinity College, Cambridge, as a scholar in 1816, and graduated B.A. 1820 and M.A. 1824.

On leaving Cambridge, Williams entered Lincoln's Inn as a student, and, after reading in the chambers of John Patteson and then with John Campbell, was called to the bar on 17 June 1823. He first joined the Oxford Circuit, where he soon found work; but when South Wales was detached and became an independent circuit, he travelled on that and the Chester Circuit.

In October 1846, Williams was made a puisne judge of the court of common pleas, and received knighthood on 4 February 1847. Some of his major judgments were in the following cases: Earl of Shrewsbury v. Scott, 6 CB. NS. 1 (Roman Catholic disabilities); Behn v. Burness, 1 B. & S. 877 (warranties in charter parties); Johnson v. Stear, 15 CB. NS. 30 (measures of damages in trover); and Spence v. Spence, 31 L. J. C. P. 189 (application of Rule in Shelley's Case).

Williams retired from the bench in 1865 owing to increasing deafness; and was created a privy councillor and a member of the Judicial Committee of the Privy Council. He died on 2 November 1875 at 24 Queen Anne's Gate, Westminster, which had been his home since 1836. He was buried at Wotton, near Dorking. A scholar and man of letters, he associated with Dean Milman, William Buckland, Richard Trench, and Henry George Liddell.

A portrait of the judge in oils, by James Sant, passed into the possession of the family.

Works
In 1824, with John Patteson, he brought out a fifth edition of his father's notes on Saunders's Reports and established his reputation in common-law learning.  In 1832 appeared the first edition of Williams's Treatise on the Law of Executors and Administrators; with seven editions during its author's lifetime, it became a standard authority.
 
Williams also edited Richard Burn's Justice of the Peace in conjunction with Serjeant D'Oyley in 1836, and Saunders's Reports in 1845 and 1871.

Family
He married, in 1826, Jane Margaret, eighth daughter of the Rev. Walter Bagot, brother to William Bagot, 1st Baron Bagot, by whom he left six sons. His fifth son, Roland Vaughan Williams, became lord justice of appeal in 1897. His grandson was the composer Ralph Vaughan Williams.

References

Attribution

1797 births
1875 deaths
English barristers
19th-century English judges
Members of the Privy Council of the United Kingdom
Members of the Judicial Committee of the Privy Council
Knights Bachelor
Justices of the Common Pleas
People educated at Westminster School, London
Alumni of Trinity College, Cambridge
Members of Lincoln's Inn